Rayen District is a district (bakhsh) in Kerman County, Kerman Province, Iran. At the 2006 census, its population was 13,903, in 3,513 families.  The district has one city:  rayen.  The district has two rural districts (dehestan): Hoseynabad-e Goruh Rural District and Rayen Rural District.

References 

Kerman County
Districts of Kerman Province